Arthur James Read (born 3 November 1999) is an English professional footballer who plays as a midfielder for EFL League Two club Colchester United. He is a product of the Luton Town academy.

Career

Luton Town
A midfielder, Read began his career with Luton Town at under-9 level. He progressed through the club's academy to the under-18 team and was awarded a scholarship in February 2016. He made his first-team debut as a 90th-minute substitute for Jake Gray in a 3–1 home defeat to Millwall in an EFL Trophy group stage match on 8 November 2016, and signed a three-year professional contract with the club two weeks later. Read continued to play predominantly for the club's development and under-18 teams, with whom he won the Bedfordshire Premier Cup in 2016 and the Youth Alliance Cup in 2018. During the next two seasons, he made six further EFL Trophy appearances, and was loaned out to National League South club Hemel Hempstead Town for one month, where he made five appearances. Read rejected the offer of a new development contract in the summer of 2019 and departed Kenilworth Road having made seven appearances and scored one goal.

Brentford
Read joined Championship club Brentford on 12 July 2019 to play in their B team, signing a one-year contract with the option of a further year, for a compensation fee. Having made 30 appearances and scored five goals in his first season with the B team, Brentford exercised the option to extend Read's contract in July 2020. He spent the entire 2020–21 season away on loan and departed when his contract expired.

Stevenage
On 10 September 2020, Read joined League Two club Stevenage on loan until the end of the 2020–21 season. He made 38 appearances, scored two goals and joined the club on a permanent contract at the end of the season.

Colchester United
On 3 January 2023, Read signed a two-and-a-half year contract with League Two side Colchester United.

Career statistics

Honours
Individual
Stevenage Player of the Month: October 2020, December 2020

References

External links

Profile at the Stevenage F.C. website

1999 births
Living people
Footballers from the London Borough of Camden
English footballers
Association football midfielders
Luton Town F.C. players
Hemel Hempstead Town F.C. players
Brentford F.C. players
Stevenage F.C. players
Colchester United F.C. players
National League (English football) players
English Football League players